Frank H. Threatt (died October 8, 1931) was a Methodist minister, politician, and public office holder in Alabama. He served in the Alabama legislature from 1872 to 1874 representing Marengo County
and was a congressional candidate from the First District in 1892 . He also held appointed office.

He was a delegate to the 1874 Alabama Equal Rights Convention. He was a delegate to the Republican National Convention in 1876.

He campaigned for a congressional seat in 1880. Oscar W. Adams was his great-grandson.

He lived in Demopolis.

References

19th-century American politicians
People from Demopolis, Alabama
African-American Methodist clergy
African-American politicians during the Reconstruction Era
African-American state legislators in Alabama
Members of the Alabama Legislature
Year of birth unknown
Date of birth unknown
Place of birth unknown
Place of death unknown
1931 deaths